The Saint John Apostle Evangelical Church in Guatemala is a result of a split in the National Evangelical Presbyterian Church of Guatemala. The pioneer pastor was Rev Guillermo Debrot, he is a pastor emeritus, only 3 pastors are active with 1 congregation. It affirms the Westminster Confession.

References 

Christian denominations in Guatemala
Presbyterian denominations in Central America
Evangelical denominations in North America